The climate of Norway is more temperate than could be expected for such high latitudes. This is mainly due to the North Atlantic Current with its extension, the Norwegian Current, raising the air temperature; the prevailing southwesterlies bringing mild air onshore; and the general southwest–northeast orientation of the coast, which allows the westerlies to penetrate into the Arctic. The January average in Brønnøysund is 15.8C (28.6F) higher than the January average in Nome, Alaska, even though both towns are situated on the west coast of the continents at 65°N. In July the difference is reduced to 3.2C (5.8F). The January average of Yakutsk, in Siberia but slightly further south, is 42.3C (76.1F) lower than in Brønnøysund.

Precipitation
Norway is among Europe's wettest countries, but with large variation in precipitation amount due to the terrain with mountain chains resulting in orographic precipitation but also creating rain shadows. In some regions, locations with vastly different precipitation amounts can be fairly close. Stryn (1661 mm) get 6 times as much precipitation as Skjåk 90 minutes drive away, Bergen has five times as much precipitation as Lærdal in the same region, and in the north Glomfjord (2141 mm) get 10 times as much precipitation as upper Saltdal (81 m) which is 68 km away as the crow flies.   
Some areas of Vestlandet and southern Nordland are among Europe's wettest, due to orographic lift, particularly where the westerlies are first intercepted by high mountains. This occurs slightly inland from the outer skerry guard. Annual precipitation can exceed  in mountain areas near the coast. Lurøy at the Arctic Circle gets  annually, a remarkable amount for a polar location. Precipitation is heaviest in late autumn and winter along the coast, while April to June is the driest.
The regions east of the mountain chain (including Oslo) have a more continental climate with generally less precipitation, and precipitation peaks in summer and early autumn, while winter and spring tend to be driest. Some valleys surrounded by mountains get very scarce precipitation, and often need irrigation in summer.

Coastal areas from Lindesnes north to Vardø have more than 200 days per year with precipitation; however, this is with a very low threshold value (0.1 mm precipitation). The average annual number of days with at least  precipitation is 77 in Blindern/Oslo, 96 in Kjevik/Kristiansand, 158 in Florida/Bergen, 93 in Værnes/Trondheim, and 109 in Tromsø.

Temperature
The coast experiences milder winters than other areas at the same latitudes. Finnmarksvidda has the coldest winters in mainland Norway, but inland areas much further south can also experience severe cold. Røros has recorded .

Bø i Vesterålen is the most northerly location in the world where all winter months have mean temperatures above . Spring is the season when the temperature differences between the southern and northern part of the country is largest; this is also the time of year when daytime and nighttime temperatures differ the most. Inland valleys and the innermost fjord areas have less wind and see the warmest summer days. Inland areas reach their peak warmth around mid-July and coastal areas by the first half of August. Humidity is usually low in summer.

The North Atlantic Current splits in two over the northern part of the Norwegian Sea, one branch going east into the Barents Sea and the other going north along the west coast of Spitsbergen. This modifies the Arctic polar climate somewhat and results in open water throughout the year at higher latitudes than any other place in the Arctic. On the eastern coast of the Svalbard archipelago, the sea used to be frozen during most of the year, but the last years' warming (graph) have seen open waters noticeably longer.

The warmest night recorded in Norway was July 29, 2019 at Sømna-Kvaløyfjellet (302 m) in Sømna near Brønnøysund with overnight low .

Compared to coastal areas, inland valleys and the innermost fjord areas have larger diurnal temperature variations, especially in spring and summer.

Examples

Table

As seen from the table, Norway's climate shows large variations, but all populated areas of the Norwegian mainland have temperate or subarctic climates (Köppen groups C and D). Svalbard and Jan Mayen have a polar climate (Köppen group E).

As a consequence of warming since 1990, summers are warmer and longer and  winters are getting shorter and milder. With the new official 1991-2020 climate normal, many areas have seen their climate change to a new climate zone compared to 1961-90 normal. Oslo's climate has moved from Dfb to Cfb/Dfb, Lillehammer's from Dfc to Dfb, Kristiansand from Cfb/Dfb to Cfb, Molde and Brønnøysund from Cfc/Dfc to Cfb, Trondheim from Dfc to Cfb/Dfb, Bodø from Cfc/Dfc to Cfb/Dfb, Tromsø (Holt) from Dfc to Cfc/Dfc and Vardø from ET to Dfc. Snow cover has decreased in most populated areas due to winter warming; days/year with 25 cm snow cover in 1991-2020 is 26 days in Oslo (94 m), 2 days in Bergen, 8 days in Trondheim/Værnes and 144 days in Tromsø. The strongest warming has been observed on Svalbard. In addition to warming, precipitation has increased in most areas, especially in winter, increasing erosion and the risk of landslides.

Weatherboxes

Climate change

See also
 Climate
 Geography of Norway

References

Climate of Norway
Norway